General William Loftus (1752 – 15 July 1831) was a British Army officer and Member of Parliament.

Early life and career
Loftus was born at Raynham in Norfolk early in 1752 and was later christened at St. Patrick's Cathedral in Dublin where his ancestor Archbishop Adam Loftus is buried. Loftus was the second son of Captain Henry Loftus, by his wife Diana, daughter of William Bullock of Sturston Hall in Norfolk.  When Loftus was eighteen, his father purchased a commission for him in Ireland in the 17th Regiment of (Light) Dragoons, which was deployed to North America in 1775, where he saw action in the American War of Independence before returning to Ireland almost three years later.

Loftus was promoted to major-general in 1796, lieutenant-general in 1803 and full general in 1813.  He served as Governor of Dumbarton Castle from 1807 to 1810 and as Lieutenant of the Tower of London from 1810, and from 1821, Colonel of the 2nd Dragoon Guards (Queen's Bays) until his death.

Loftus died peacefully at his house in Wimpole Street on 15 July 1831 and was buried eight days later alongside his second wife Lady Elizabeth Loftus in the Townshend family vault at Raynham Hall.

Role in the American War of Independence
Loftus embarked for Boston from Cork on 10 April 1775 and arrived at a city under siege by local militia on 24 May.   Three weeks later, Loftus, a cavalry Cornet, volunteered to dismount for his first military action at Bunker Hill overlooking the city, under the command of General Sir William Howe, who on this occasion, was pleased to give him the rank of Lieutenant.  The shock of one of the bloodiest battles of the war was followed by long winter months under siege in Boston, which ended in an ignominious evacuation in March 1776.  Loftus was seconded as an assistant engineer building fortifications in Halifax, Nova Scotia for the next few months (ibid.).

In July 1776, Loftus landed with his regiment on Staten Island, where the 17th joined forces with the newly recruited Hessian troops.  He distinguished himself with great gallantry  in his first command on the Bedford Road under Sir William Erskine, personally commended by General Howe for his part in driving back the Americans and capturing General Sullivan, together with two Brigadier-Generals and ten field officers (ibid).  A few weeks later at Kip's Bay, Loftus was presented with the opportunity to change the course of history when he saw General Washington virtually unguarded and galloped to:

"...within a hundred yards of that General George Washington, whom he nearly captured.  The men whom he had with him were all knocked out of their saddles by the American riflemen concealed behind a fence.  Had he been fortunate enough to take such a prize, probably the whole course of events would have changed."

This account may well be apocryphal but it matches what is now known about a moment of fury on that day, 15 September 1776, when Washington briefly lowered his guard. A few weeks later, Loftus had the honour of being selected with twenty picked light dragoons, as General Howe's personal guard at Pelham Manor.  At White Plains, Howe chose him to lead the Hessian Grenadiers across the Bronx River, where he was wounded.  His wounds were not critical and he was back in the field the following month, when he joined Lord Percy's brigade at the Battle of Fort Washington.  His regiment was unable to provide any hope for further promotion, so Loftus transferred to a company in the 44th regiment and was ordered by General Knyphausen to defend a pass at Kingsbridge with one hundred men.  The pass was defended, finally pushing the militia back in Kingsbridge in what was one of the heaviest defeats for the Americans in that war but Loftus was once again wounded, and withdrew to winter quarters, missing the action at The Battle of Trenton.  Loftus returned to active duty with Colonel Bird up the Hudson River to Peck's Hill in January 1777, where they blew up the American ammunitions stores. This was followed by a number of actions in New Jersey in 1777. Loftus was promoted to captain and returned to Ireland as aide-de-camp to the Lord Lieutenants of Ireland at Dublin Castle.

Rebellion in Ireland

Loftus was appointed as ADC to successive Lords Lieutenant of Ireland from 1778 until 1783.  He forged life-time friendships in this office, seen as "a good officer and so respectable in his character and connexxions".  Loftus returned to active duty in the 3rd Regiment of Guards purchasing a company  in 1784, and served as Lt-Colonel  based in London.  He moved his family to Norfolk in 1790 (ibid.) and in 1794, raised the 24th Light Dragoons, appointed Brevet Colonel of that regiment(portrait left). In 1796, Loftus was made a Major General on the English staff and was sworn in as a Member of the Irish Parliament for Lord Ely and returned to Westminster as member for Great Yarmouth for Lord Townshend in the same year.  Loftus was removed to the Irish staff in 1797 at the request of Lord Camden and appointed to be Commander in Chief in Munster based in Cork.  He reported back to Camden that the Catholics of Munster were in favour of "good order and government" and that if he wanted to root out sedition, he should look at "Dublin or the North". Loftus left the grateful citizens of Cork in 1798 to take command of Laughlinstown camp.  In the same year, he commanded a brigade at the battle of Vinegar Hill and  presided over a military court at the trial of Wolfe Tone.

In 1800 Loftus was transferred back to the staff in England but retained both Irish and Parliamentary seats to see the Act of Union through.

Family
Loftus married firstly on 18 February 1778, Margaret daughter of Maccerel King of Lesson Hall, Dublin. They had two sons and two daughters before she died on 4 May 1786. He was married secondly on 7 May 1790 to Lady Elizabeth Townshend, daughter of George Townshend, 1st Marquess Townshend. They had five sons and four daughters.

References

External links 
 

1752 births
1831 deaths
British Army generals
17th Lancers officers
2nd Dragoon Guards (Queen's Bays) officers
British Army personnel of the American Revolutionary War
Members of the Parliament of Great Britain for English constituencies
British MPs 1796–1800
Irish MPs 1790–1797
Irish MPs 1798–1800
William
Members of the Parliament of the United Kingdom for English constituencies
UK MPs 1801–1802
UK MPs 1802–1806
UK MPs 1806–1807
UK MPs 1807–1812
UK MPs 1812–1818
Members of the Parliament of Ireland (pre-1801) for County Wexford constituencies
18th-century Anglo-Irish people
19th-century Anglo-Irish people